The 2007–08 Biathlon World Cup – World Cup 2 was the second event of the season and was held in Hochfilzen, Austria, from December 7 until December 9, 2007.

Schedule of events
The schedule of the event is below.

Medal winners

Men

Women

References

2
Biathlon World Cup - World Cup 2
World Cup - World Cup 2,2007-08
Biathlon World Cup - World Cup 2
Biathlon World Cup - World Cup 2,2007-08